Maksimovka is a rural locality (a selo) and the administrative center of Maksimovsky Selsoviet of Oktyabrsky District, Amur Oblast, Russia. The population was 332 as of 2018. There are 6 streets.

Geography 
Maksimovka is located 39 km southwest of Yekaterinoslavka (the district's administrative centre) by road. Kutilovo is the nearest rural locality.

References 

Rural localities in Oktyabrsky District, Amur Oblast